Oleksandr Maksymov (born 13 February 1985 in Zaporizhia) is a Ukrainian footballer who most recently played for Pembroke Athleta in Malta.

Career
He also played for Torpedo-BelAZ Zhodino in the Belarusian Premier League, FC Dnipro Dnipropetrovsk, FC Arsenal Kyiv and the Ukraine national football team. He was in the Ukraine under-21 squad when and was a finalist of the UEFA U-21 Cup, but the team lost to the Netherlands.

In summer 2007 he signed from FC Kharkiv.

Honours
Ukraine under-21
 UEFA Under-21 Championship: runner-up 2006

Footnotes

External links

1985 births
Living people
Ukrainian footballers
Ukraine international footballers
Ukrainian expatriate footballers
Expatriate footballers in Belarus
Ukrainian expatriate sportspeople in Belarus
Expatriate footballers in Malta
Ukrainian expatriate sportspeople in Malta
Ukraine youth international footballers
Ukraine under-21 international footballers
Ukrainian Premier League players
Association football midfielders
FC Borysfen Boryspil players
FC Dynamo-2 Kyiv players
FC Dynamo-3 Kyiv players
FC Metalist Kharkiv players
FC Kharkiv players
FC Dnipro players
FC Kryvbas Kryvyi Rih players
FC Arsenal Kyiv players
FC Sevastopol players
FC Metalurh Zaporizhzhia players
FC Olimpik Donetsk players
FC Torpedo-BelAZ Zhodino players
Pembroke Athleta F.C. players